Alekos Alexiadis (born 3 September 1945) is a retired Greek football player. Alexiadis was a star forward for Aris during the period 1963–1975. He was second, behind Dinos Kouis, on the all-time scorers list for Aris, having found the mark 127 times in his 301 appearances for the club. In 1976, Alexiadis played for Panetolikos and the following year for Kastoria. Overall, Alexiadis has an impressive 134 goals in 329 appearances in the Alpha Ethniki. He was capped twice by the Greece National Football Team, scoring 2 goals.

References

1945 births
Living people
Footballers from Thessaloniki
Greek footballers
Super League Greece players
Aris Thessaloniki F.C. players
Panetolikos F.C. players
Kastoria F.C. players
Greece international footballers
Association football forwards